The Intelligence Bureau (IB) (Hindi: आसूचना ब्यूरो; IAST: āsūcanā byūro) is India's internal security and counter-intelligence agency under Ministry of Home Affairs. It was founded in 1887 as Central Special Branch, and is reputed to be the oldest such organization in the world. 

Until 1968, it handled both domestic and foreign intelligence after which Research and Analysis Wing was formed specifically for foreign intelligence following that IB was primarily assigned the role of domestic intelligence and internal security. Tapan Deka, the current director of the IB, took over from Arvind Kumar on 24 June 2022.

History
In 1885, Major General Charles MacGregor was appointed Quartermaster General for the British Indian Army at Simla and thereby became responsible for its intelligence activities. The main concern of the time was to monitor Russian troop deployments in Afghanistan so as to avoid an invasion of British India from the northwest. In 1909, the Indian Political Intelligence Office was established in England in response to the development of Indian revolutionary activities. It came to be called Indian Political Intelligence (IPI) in 1921, constituting a surveillance and monitoring agency run jointly by the India Office and the Government of India and maintaining close contact with Scotland Yard and MI5. After Indian independence in 1947, IPI was renamed as the Intelligence Bureau under the Ministry of Home Affairs.

Responsibilities
Shrouded in secrecy, the IB is used to garner intelligence from within India and also execute counter-intelligence and counter-terrorism tasks. The Bureau comprises employees from law enforcement agencies, mostly from the Indian Police Service (IPS) or the Indian Revenue Service (IRS) and the military. However, the Director of Intelligence Bureau (DIB) has always been an IPS officer. In addition to domestic intelligence responsibilities, the IB is particularly tasked with intelligence collection in border areas, following the 1951 recommendations of the Himmat Singh Ji Committee (also known as the North and North-East Border Committee), a task entrusted to the military intelligence organisations prior to independence in 1947. All spheres of human activity within India and in the neighborhood are allocated to the charter of duties of the Intelligence Bureau. The IB was also tasked with other external intelligence responsibilities as of 1951 until 1968, when the Research and Analysis Wing was formed.

Activities and operations
The Intelligence Bureau reportedly has a lot of successes to its credit, but operations conducted by the IB are rarely declassified. Due to the extreme secrecy surrounding the agency, there is little concrete information available about it or its activities.  The IB was trained by the Soviet KGB from the 1950s onward until the collapse of the Soviet Union.
Understanding of the shadowy workings of the IB is largely speculative. Many times even members' own family members are unaware of their whereabouts. One known task of the IB is to clear licences to amateur radio enthusiasts. The IB also passes intelligence between other Indian intelligence agencies and the police. The bureau also grants the necessary security clearances to Indian diplomats and judges before they take the oath. On rare occasions, IB officers interact with the media during a crisis situation. The IB is also rumoured to intercept and open around 6,000 letters daily. It also has an email spying system similar to FBI's Carnivore system. The bureau is authorised to conduct wiretapping without a warrant.

The IB was initially India's internal and external intelligence agency. Due to lapses on the part of the Intelligence Bureau to predict the Sino-Indian War of 1962, and later on, intelligence failure in the India-Pakistan War in 1965, it was bifurcated in 1968 and entrusted with the task of internal intelligence only. The external intelligence branch was handed to the newly created Research and Analysis Wing.

IB operated a counterintelligence programme to prevent the CIA from gathering information about the preparations and activities related to the Indian Nuclear weapons project before the Pokhran-II nuclear tests.

IB had mixed success in counter-terrorism. It was reported in 2008 that the IB had been successful in busting terror modules. It alerted the police before the Hyderabad blasts and gave repeated warnings of a possible attack on Mumbai through the sea before the November 2008 Mumbai attacks. On the whole, however, the IB came in for some sharp criticism by the media after the relentless wave of terror attacks in 2008. The government came close to sacking top intelligence officials soon after 26/11 attacks because of serious lapses that led to the 2008 Mumbai attacks. Heavy politics, under-funding and a shortage of field agents were the chief problems facing the agency. The overall strength of the agency is believed to be around 25,000, with 3500-odd field agents operating in the entire country. Of these, many were engaged in political intelligence.

Since 2014, IB has undergone many reforms and changes. 
One of the biggest reforms was the cessation of internal-political espionage.
The agency has also boosted up its infrastructure and recruited more agents. It has been successful in stopping the earlier pattern of frequent terror attacks in India.
The agency has also been successful in counter-intelligence.

Workings
The Group A (Gazetted) officers carry out coordination and higher-level management of the IB. Subsidiary Intelligence Bureaus (SIBs) are headed by officers of the rank of Joint Director or above, but smaller SIBs are also sometimes headed by Deputy Directors. The SIBs have their units at district headquarters headed by Assistant Director (AD) or Deputy Central Intelligence Officers (DCIO). The IB maintains a large number of field units and headquarters (which are under the control of Joint or Deputy Directors). It is through these offices and the intricate process of deputation that a very organic linkage between the state police agencies and the IB is maintained. In addition to these, at the national level the IB has several units (in some cases SIBs) to keep track of issues like terrorism, counter-intelligence, VIP security, threat assessment and sensitive areas (i.e. Jammu and Kashmir and such). IB officers (like their counterparts in R&AW) get monthly special pays and an extra one-month salary every year, as well as better promotions. IB Officers are either directly recruited or are deputed from 
CAPFs and Armed Forces.

Constitutionality
IB was created on 23 December 1887, by the British Secretary of State as a sub-sect of the Central Special Branch but there is no act of the Indian parliament nor executive order relating to the functioning of the IB. In 2013, a public interest litigant challenged the legality of IB.

Ranks and insignia

 

Besides the above posts, there are various other supporting and office posts in the Bureau as well.

Media portrayal

The Intelligence Bureau has been depicted in films such as Bad Aur Badnaam (Hindi, 1984), Mukhbiir (Hindi, 2008), Vande Matharam (Tamil, 2010), Kahaani (Hindi, 2012),  Jism 2 (Hindi, 2012), Iru Mugan (Tamil, 2016), and Spyder (Tamil, Telugu, 2017).

IB also featured in the Sony TV Series Yudh starring Amitabh Bachchan.

See also

 List of Indian intelligence agencies

Footnotes

Notes

References

Further reading
 MacGregor, Lady (Ed.). The Life and Opinions of Major-General Sir Charles MacGregor.  2 vols. 1888, Edinburgh
 MacGregor, General Sir Charles. The Defence of India. Shimla: Government of India Press. 1884.
 Kulkarni. Sin of National Conscience. 2005.

External links
 The Intelligence Bureau: India’s Prime Intelligence Agency By Maloy Krishna Dhar

 
Indian intelligence agencies
1887 establishments in India
Government agencies established in 1887
Domestic intelligence agencies